Beiranvand is an Iranian surname. Notable people with the surname include:

Alireza Beiranvand (born 1992), Iranian football goalkeeper 
Mohsen Beiranvand (born 1981), Iranian weightlifter

Persian-language surnames